John Cox may refer to:

Arts and entertainment
John Howard (American actor) (1913–1995), American actor, birth name John R. Cox, Jr.
John Cox (director) (born 1935), English theatre director
John Cox (sound engineer) (1908–1972), English sound engineer
John Cox (special effects artist) (born 1959), Australian special effects artist
Jack E. Cox (1896–1960), or John J. Cox, an English cinematographer 
John Rogers Cox (1915–1990), American painter

Military
Sir John Cox (Royal Navy officer, died 1672), English naval officer killed at the Battle of Solebay
Sir John William Cox (1821–1901), British Army general serving in Afghanistan and in the Crimea War, see List of British generals and brigadiers
Sir John Cox (Royal Navy officer, born 1928) (1928–2006), British Royal Navy admiral
John V. Cox (born 1930), United States Marine Corps naval aviator

Politics
John Cox (Virginia politician) (born 1944), American politician, member of the Virginia House of Delegates
John F. Cox (born 1955), American attorney, politician, and city manager
John H. Cox (born 1955), American businessman, radio host, and Republican gubernatorial candidate in California
John I. Cox (1855–1946), American politician, governor of Tennessee
John W. Cox Jr. (born 1947), American politician, Illinois lawyer, and former Congressman, Democrat
John W. Cox (Minnesota politician) (1888–1958), American politician and businessman
John R. Cox, American politician, candidate in the United States House of Representatives election in Alaska, 2010

Sports
Johnny Cox (born 1936), American basketball player
Chubby Cox (born 1955), American basketball player, full name John Arthur Cox III
John Cox (basketball, born 1981), Venezuelan-American basketball player
John Cox (cricketer) (1823–1866), Australian cricketer
John Cox (footballer) (born 1870), England international footballer
Jack Cox (footballer) (1877–1955), British footballer and manager
John Cox (wrestler), British wrestler

Other
John B. Cox, British-Australian ornithologist
John Carrington Cox (born 1943), American professor and economist
John Charles Cox (1843–1919), English cleric and local historian
John Coates Cox, died 1816, doctor who tried to free Abdul Rahman Ibrahima Sori from slavery
John Cox (chess player) (born 1962), English chess player and chess author
John Cox (psychiatrist), British psychiatrist and President of the Royal College of Psychiatrists
John Cox (priest) (born 1940), Archdeacon of Sudbury
John Edmund Cox, English cleric and antiquarian
John Henry Cox (1750–1791), English explorer
John Mark Cox Jr., first African American to attend Rollins College, Florida
John Watson Cox (1902–1984), New Zealand lawyer and town planning administrator

See also
Jon Cox (born 1986), American soccer player
Jon Cox (politician), American politician from Utah
Jack Cox (disambiguation)
John Cocks (disambiguation)
Sir John Cox Bray (1842–1894), premier of South Australia
John Cox Dillman Engleheart (1784–1862), British miniature painter
John Cox Stevens (1785–1857), first Commodore of the New York Yacht Club
John Cocke (disambiguation)
John Coxe (disambiguation)